Patrick Calvar (born 26 November 1955) served as head of the French General Directorate for Internal Security from 30 May 2012 to 31 May 2017.

Awards
Chevalier of the Legion of Honour (10 April 2009)
Chevalier of the National Order of Merit (15 November 2004)

References

1955 births
Living people
Chevaliers of the Légion d'honneur
General Directorate for Internal Security